Cedar Dream Songs is an album by Bill Miller, released through Paras Recordings on April 20, 2004. In 2005, the album won Miller the Grammy Award for Best Native American Music Album.

Track listing
 "Unspoken Prayer" (Bill Miller, Joshua Yudkin) – 5:33
 "Faith of Fire" (Miller, Yudkin) – 5:15
 "Prophecy" (Miller, Yudkin) – 3:33
 "Pathway to Dreams" (Miller, Yudkin) – 6:44
 "Blood Brothers" (Miller, Yudkin) – 2:15
 "Sacred Ground" (Miller, Yudkin) – 5:24
 "Birds of the Air" (Miller, Yudkin) – 7:54
 "Peace Offering" (Miller) – 3:20
 "Calling the Rain" (Miller) – 5:36

Personnel
 Charlie Lico – executive producer
 Bill Miller – flute, guitar, percussion, composer, vocals, producer, paintings, audio production
 Terry Nirva – percussion
 Michael Page – art direction
 Jim Snowden – executive producer
 Michael Von Muchow – bass guitar
 Joshua Yudkin – composer, keyboards

References

External links
 Bill Miller's official site

2004 albums
Grammy Award for Best Native American Music Album